Crispin is a masculine given name. Notable people with the name include:

 Sir Crispin Agnew, 11th Baronet (born 1944), Advocate, officer of arms former explorer and Chief of the Name and Arms of Agnew
 Crispin Alapag  (born 1971), American actor and author known for Criminal Minds, Ray Donovan, This Is Us, Swat, Rush Hour and VR Troopers Power Rangers and book The 15 Laws Of Acting
 Crispin Beltran (1933–2008), Filipino politician and a labor leader
 Crispin Blunt (born 1960), the Conservative Member of Parliament for the English constituency of Reigate
 Crispin Bonham-Carter (born 1969), English actor
 Crispin Castro Monroy (born 1936), Mexican municipal president of Santa Cruz Atizapán from January 1970 to January 1972
 Crispin Conroy (born 1963), Australian diplomat
 Crispin Duenas (born 1986), Canadian Olympic recurve archer
 Crispin Freeman (born 1972), American voice actor
 Crispin Glover (born 1964), American film actor
 Crispin S. Gregoire (born in 1956), Permanent Representative to the United Nations for the Commonwealth of Dominica
 Crispin Grey-Johnson (born 1946), Gambian political figure
 Crispin Gray, guitarist and songwriter for musical groups Queen Adreena and The Dogbones
 Crispin Hunt, English lead singer of the Britpop group Longpigs
 Crispin Nash-Williams (1932–2001), British mathematician
 Crispian St. Peters (1939-2010) English singer and songwriter 
 Crispin Salvador (1937–2002), Filipino writer and intellectual known for his novels, essays and short-fiction
 Crispin Sanchez (1925–2008), South Texas trailblazer in the fields of Mexican-American education and sports
 Crispin Sartwell (born 1958), American philosophy professor, anarchist and journalist
 Crispin Shumina, member of the Pan-African Parliament from Zambia
 Crispin Tickell (born 1930), English diplomat, environmentalist and academic
 Crispin van den Broeck (1523–1591), Flemish painter
 Crispin Wright (born 1942), English philosopher
 Crispin Howarth (born 1970), English Oceanic art historian and curator 
 Crispin Yobonzie Mwinlanaa (Born 1993) Ghanaian Medical Doctor  
 Crispyn Coller (Born 1990) American Technology Professional 
Fictional characters:
 Crispin Cronk, character in the Harry Potter novels by J.K. Rowling

References 

Masculine given names